Srirama Chandra Bhanja Medical College and Hospital is a public medical college in Cuttack in the Indian state of Odisha, named after Srirama Chandra Bhanja. 

It is one of the oldest centers of medical teaching and training in India. It has been recognized by Medical Council of India (MCI). It is an undergraduate institution facilitating education and training in super specialty subjects under medical and surgical disciplines.

History

The evolution of this institution dates back to the beginning of the 19th century. It took its birth as a small dispensary as First Aid Centre in the premises of the present medical college during the days of Maharatha rule in the later half of the eighteenth century. The sole purpose of that dispensary was to render whatever little medical assistance was available and feasible to the sick pilgrims en route to and from Puri, especially during the "Car Festival" of Lord Jagannath.

This dispensary continued to function admirably till the British occupation of Orissa in 1803. The British rulers, in due course of time, realized the strategic importance of this dispensary at Cuttack and converted it into small hospital. For smooth management of the Hospital, they made provisions for pumping adequate money from the "Annachhatra Fund".

In 1875, the Orissa Medical School was born by the effort of a Madras (Chennai) born Scottish Dr William Day Stewart, the then Civil Surgeon of Cuttack as its first principal. he mooted out the idea of starting a medical school, utilizing this hospital as an infrastructural nucleus. In this endeavour, he received the kind support and sincere patronage of the then Lt. Governor, Sir Richard Temple and the Divisional Commissioner, Mr T.E Ravenshaw. Dr William Day Stewart who took the initiative in setting up the Medical and Stewart school passed away on 23 November 1890 at age 50 and lies buried at  the local 'Gora Kabar' cemetery.

First the Orissa Medical School was established with a capacity of 20 L.M.P (Licentiate Medical Practitioners) students. It was affiliated to the Bihar and Orissa Medical Examination Board which grantee the LMP Diploma.

In 1944, the Orissa Medical School was renamed as Orissa Medical College and Major A.T Anderson, the then Civil Surgeon of Cuttack acted as its first principal. he wanted to improve the Orissa Medical College as per the pattern existed in U.K which was highly appreciated by Lt.Col.A.N.Chopra, the then Director of Health and I.G, Prisons. They recommended to the Government to upgrade the existing medical school to the status of College. The Parla Ministry consisting of Maharaja of Paralakhemundi. Maharaja Krishna Chandra Gajapati Dev, Mr Abdus Subhan Khan (Minister of Health and Education) and Pandit Godabrish Misra gave due attention to this issue and finally the Orissa Medical College was born on 1 June 1944 with a capacity of 22 students into MBBS Degree Course.

The college was affiliated to Utkal University and the first batch appeared in the Final MBBS Examination in 1948. The college received recognition for MBBS degree from Medical Council of Indian in the year 1952 with retrospective effect.

In 1951, the Orissa Medical College was subsequently renamed as SRIRAM CHANDRA BHANJ MEDICAL COLLEGE in recognition of the donation and efforts made by Mayurbhanj State Maharaja Sriram Chandra Bhanj Deo. Moreover, Maharajah Vikram Deo Varma of Jeypore, the founding father of Andhra University also donated  to this medical college.

The college received recognition for MBBS degree from Medical Council of India in 1952 with retrospective effect. Postgraduate courses in M.D./M.S. specialties were started in 1960. Since 1981, post-doctoral training leading to the award of D.M. and M.Ch. degrees have been instituted in the disciplines of Cardiology and Neurosurgery respectively.

Academics

SCB Medical College provides degree courses for MBBS, MD, MS, DM, MCh and diploma courses. Its intake for MBBS courses is 250 and for postgraduate courses it is approximately 150. A dental wing in the college campus imparts B.D.S. degrees under Utkal University. At present this college extends facility for postgraduate training in all the 21 broad specialties.

The college offers the four-and-a-half-year M.B.B.S. course with a one-year compulsory rotating internship in affiliated hospitals. There are 250 seats, all the seats are filled through a single window all India medical test known as NEET-UG of which 85%  seats are reserved for state quote and 15% for All India Quota(AIQ). Admission is extremely competitive.

The college offers more than 150 seats in post graduate courses. Admission is through the Odisha Post Graduate Medical Examination (50%) and at the national level through the All India Post Graduate Medical Entrance Examination.

National programmes like family Welfare Training in Regional Family Welfare Training Centre, Post Partum Programme attached to Obstetrics & Gynecology Department, ICMR Programme, IGNOU study center, Regional Spinal injury center and treatment of Geriatric patients in Geriatric OPD are functioning in this institution.

Ranking 

Sriram Chandra Bhanj Deo Medical College ranked 44 in India by the National Institutional Ranking Framework medical ranking for 2022.

Student life

Undergraduate and post graduate students hail from all over India. The campus has five hostels including Old Gents Hostel and New Gents Hostel for undergraduate men. It has one each hostel for undergraduate women, postgraduate women, postgraduate men, house staff students and nursing students.

Both undergraduate (UG Students' Union) and post graduate students (Junior Doctor's Association) have their union. Representatives of the student body are elected annually in a campus-wide election.

The inter-collegiate cultural, literary and sports festival of SCB Medical College is called Synapse and is held in late December and early January every year. It is organized by the Students Union. In addition, the Students Union holds annual inter-class competitions where undergraduate students within SCB Medical College compete in cultural, literary and sporting events.

Each hostel has a TV room and one reading room. The campus has many canteens for students and staff. The campus also has a Gymnasium for men and women and grounds for cricket, tennis and basketball. It has also a swimming pool for students.

Library
A student library is inside the campus with more than 500 seats having sections for undergraduate and postgraduate students. The Central Library is one of the referral medical libraries in the state of Odisha. It has been declared as resource library in the Eastern Region by Govt. of India in the year 1993.

Medical facilities

The hospital provides service at its Outpatient department, Casualty and indoor services. It has a regional diagnostic center with MRI and CT scans. It has a blood bank and eye bank facility.

Super specialty facilities

Super specialty services of the hospital include the following:
 OPD
 Acharya Harihar Regional Cancer Centre
 Shishu Bhavan for Pediatric Patients
 Regional Spinal Injury Center
 Regional Center for Ophthalmology
 Regional Center for Tuberculosis
 Intermediate Reference Laboratory
 Cardiology Center
 Antiretroviral Therapy Center

A multi-specialty trauma center is under construction for special care of trauma patients

Telemedicine services
In 2001, telemedicine Service has been established in, collaboration with ISRO and Sanjay Gandhi Post Graduate Institute of Medical Sciences, Lucknow for providing distant Medical Education to our medical students, tele consultation for critically ill patients, follow-up treatment facility to the patient who are treated earlier and Tele medical video conference are also being provided.

References

Medical colleges in Odisha
Utkal University
Education in Cuttack
Educational institutions established in 1944
1944 establishments in India
Colleges affiliated to Utkal University
Universities and colleges in Odisha